Trachyte is a volcanic rock.

Trachyte may also refer to:
Trachyte Creek, a stream in Utah
Trachyte Hill, a hill in Antarctica
Trachyte Hills, a mountain range in British Columbia, Canada

See also
Trachytes (mite)